Filipe Daniel Mendes Barros (born 17 April 1992), commonly known as Pipo, is a Portuguese footballer who plays for Rebordosa A.C. as a forward.

References

External links

1992 births
Living people
People from Paredes, Portugal
Portuguese footballers
Association football forwards
Liga Portugal 2 players
Segunda Divisão players
FC Porto players
C.D. Santa Clara players
F.C. Famalicão players
G.D. Ribeirão players
AD Oliveirense players
F.C. Tirsense players
S.C. Freamunde players
Rebordosa A.C. players
Cypriot Second Division players
Akritas Chlorakas players
Portugal youth international footballers
Portugal under-21 international footballers
Portuguese expatriate footballers
Expatriate footballers in Cyprus
Portuguese expatriate sportspeople in Cyprus
Sportspeople from Porto District